Parliamentary by-elections in the United Kingdom occur when a Member of Parliament (MP) vacates a House of Commons seat (due to resignation, death, disqualification or expulsion) during the course of a parliament.

Scope of these records 
Although the history of Parliament is much older, most of these records concern only the period since 1945. Earlier exceptional results are listed separately.

Parliaments of England, Scotland, Ireland and the various unions of these Kingdoms had been assembled since the medieval period, though these bodies only gradually evolved to be democratically elected by the populace and records are incomplete. England and Wales had numerous "rotten boroughs" with tiny and tightly controlled electorates until the Reform Act of 1832. The most recent significant expansions of the electoral franchise were the Representation of the People Act 1918 which allowed some women to vote for the first time and greatly expanded the franchise of men, overall more than doubling the size of the electorate, and the Representation of the People (Equal Franchise) Act 1928 which expanded the franchise of women to be equal to that of men.

Furthermore, there are various additional factors complicating comparisons between earlier results and modern cases. Among the most significant aspects of historical elections which are no longer present are:

Frequent interventions and withdrawals of parties in different seats.
Frequent coalitions between parties, splits within parties and floor-crossing by members.
Uncontested elections and truces between parties, in particular during both World Wars.
Generally more significant competition from independent candidates and minor parties.
Multi-member seats and university seats (abolished 1950).
Higher frequency of by-elections, partly due to the practice of often uncontested ministerial by-elections which ended in 1926.
Generally higher turnouts, although several wartime elections exhibited the lowest recorded turnouts.
Generally higher variation in size of constituency electorates.

Since 1945, the legal and general political situation regarding by-elections has been broadly stable, allowing for meaningful comparison of records.

These records include those from Northern Ireland. However, the politics of Northern Ireland is mostly separate from that of Great Britain so comparisons can be problematic.

Glossary
For comparison purposes the following definitions have been adopted.

Gain - victory by a party that was not victorious at the immediate previous election
Loss - defeat of a party that was victorious at the immediate previous election
Hold - victory by a party that was victorious at the immediate previous election
Win - victory by a party. ambiguous term that could mean either a gain or a hold 
Incumbent - the party that held the seat at the immediately previous election, irrespective of any intervening change of candidate or candidate's change of party
Third party - In England, since 1922, the "third party" has been the Liberal Party and its successor, the Liberal Democrats. Additionally, in Scotland and Wales the Scottish National Party (SNP) and Plaid Cymru are also considered to be third parties. Prior to 1922, the third party was the Labour Party.
Minor party - parties smaller than the third party
Uncontested - an election where only one candidate is put forward. No votes are actually cast and the candidate is by definition the victor.

Numerical records

For more information about what is meant by the term "swing", see Swing (United Kingdom)

Largest swings in percentage share of votes

1 By-elections where the seat was held by the incumbent MP.
2 By-elections contested by the incumbent MP, who failed to gain re-election.
3 By-elections where the seat was held by the incumbent party.

Largest swings to an incumbent governing party 
It is rare to see any swing towards the governing party in by-elections. However, there are some examples of it happening.

*BOLD indicates winning party

Largest fall in percentage share of vote
A party's share of the vote at a general election is not always matched at subsequent by-elections, but given the five-year maximum term of a Parliament, reductions of 20% or more are unusual. Those of 25% or more are listed below:

In the 1934 Merthyr by-election the Independent Labour Party share dropped from 69.4% in the 1931 general election to 9.8% (a record 59.6% loss) losing the seat to the Labour Party. However, the 1931 election had no Labour Party candidate, and the MP, R. C. Wallhead, had previously been elected as a Labour candidate in prior elections, when the ILP was affiliated to Labour. Prior to his death, Wallhead joined the Labour Party, so this result could be classed as a Labour hold.

The 1919 East Antrim by-election saw the Irish Unionist party face its first Unionist opposition in the seat since 1906 (in the 1918 general election the heavily unionist area gave the Irish Unionist 94.6% of the vote in a contest with a Sinn Féin candidate). An Independent Unionist candidate won the seat, with the Irish Unionist share dropping by 52.8%

Worst results for other parties:

Note:
a Compared with the Brexit Party candidate at the general election.

Largest increase in percentage share of vote

Largest winning share of the vote
Winning shares of the vote above 90%, since 1918:

Largest numerical majority overturned 
Majorities over 9,000 votes overturned:

Lowest winning share of the vote
Winning shares of the vote below 35%, since 1918:

The 1920 Stockport by-election, was held to elect two MPs. The winners' shares of the total vote were 25.6% and 25.1%. However, as each voter could cast two votes, the situation is not readily comparable to other by-elections in this period.

At the 1909 Sheffield Attercliffe by-election, the winning candidate took only 27.5% of the vote.

Lowest share of the vote

Major parties
Major parties winning 2% or less share of votes cast in a by-election, since 1918:

The worst Conservative performance was in the 1995 North Down by-election, where they took 2.1% of the votes cast.

The 'continuation' Social Democratic Party (SDP) took 0.4% of the vote at both the 1990 Upper Bann by-election and the Bootle by-election the following week.

Candidates winning fewer than ten votes
Since 1918:1

1 F. R. Lees, a Temperance Chartist, won no votes in the 1860 Ripon by-election, as his supporters mistakenly believed that he had withdrawn.
2 Bevan put his occupation of "Systems Designer" in the description field of the nomination paper, which appeared on the ballot paper. He was an independent candidate.

Smallest majorities
All majorities of less than 1,000 since the Second World War. Bold entries indicate a new record.

Still smaller majorities have been recorded since 1918. The majority in the 1921 Penrith and Cockermouth by-election, was only 31 votes, and in the 1924 Westminster Abbey by-election it was 43 votes, while at the 1928 Carmarthen by-election it was 47 votes. At the 1892 Cirencester by-election a majority of 3 for the Unionists was overturned on petition, where it was found that both candidates had an equal number of votes. A fresh by-election was called, which was won by the Liberals. The 1830 Liverpool by-election saw a majority of 29 votes.

Turnout
Turnout is the percentage of registered electors who voted.

Highest turnout
The highest turnouts since 1918.

Turnout increased from general election
It is highly unusual for a by-election to attract a higher turnout in a seat than the previous general election.

Lowest turnout
During the Second World War the electoral register was not kept up to date despite significant population movements, especially in the London area (which contains all three constituencies listed below). Consequently, only those eligible to vote in the constituency at the outbreak of war were eligible to vote in the by-elections and many voters were physically unable to as they were located elsewhere; in addition the major parties did not compete against each other. The lowest turnout in peacetime since 1918 was 18.2% at the 2012 Manchester Central by-election. The lowest turnouts since 1918 have been:

1942 Poplar South by-election: 9.3%
1941 Harrow by-election: 10.7% 
1944 Camberwell North by-election: 11.2%

Turnouts of less than 30% since 1945 (bold indicates a new post-war record)

Most candidates

Under current UK electoral law there is no upper or lower limit for candidature numbers, with the only required stipulation being the valid nomination of ten electors from the constituency. By-elections often attract "fringe" or novelty candidates, single-issue candidates, or independents. As with nominations in a general election, candidates must pay a £500 deposit, which is only refunded if the candidate wins 5% of the votes cast.

All by-elections with more than ten candidates are listed. Elections are listed in alphabetical order. Those that created a new record number appear in bold.

In 2017, the countermanded poll in Manchester Gorton had 11 candidates.

Fewest candidates

*1 The most recent mainland UK instance only is given.
*2 Four of these eight were between the Unionist incumbent and a "paper candidate" using the name "Peter Barry", the name of the then Irish Minister of Foreign Affairs.

Candidate records

Durable by-election candidates

Major parties
Former Labour cabinet minister Tony Benn contested no fewer than four by-elections during his career, topping the poll on each occasion: Bristol South East in 1950, 1961 and 1963, and Chesterfield in 1984. His first and last by-election victories were 33 years and 3 months apart.

Former cabinet minister and European Commissioner Roy Jenkins fought two different by-elections for the Social Democratic Party only eight months apart. He narrowly failed in the 1981 Warrington by-election before winning the 1982 Glasgow Hillhead by-election. He had been first elected as a Labour MP almost 34 years previously in the 1948 Southwark Central by-election.

Former Speaker of the House of Commons, Betty Boothroyd finally secured election at her third by-election attempt at the 1973 West Bromwich by-election. She had previously failed in the 1957 Leicester South East by-election and the 1968 Nelson and Colne by-election as well as the general elections of 1959 and 1970.

John Bickley of UKIP contested three by-elections (all in Greater Manchester) within two years - Wythenshawe and Sale East in February 2014, Heywood and Middleton in October 2014 and Oldham West and Royton in December 2015. He was defeated on each occasion, coming closest in Heywood and Middleton where he lost by less than 700 votes. Bickley also contested Heywood and Middleton at the 2015 general election, making a total of four parliamentary elections contested in fewer than 24 months.

Minor parties and independents
Perennial fringe candidates include such personalities as Bill Boaks, whose highest vote was at the 1982 Beaconsfield by-election with 99 votes. Screaming Lord Sutch was for most of his career the leader of the Official Monster Raving Loony Party. His highest vote total was 1,114 at the 1994 Rotherham by-election. Lindi St Clair of the Corrective Party contested eleven by-elections without success, her highest total being 216 votes as 'Lady Whiplash' at the 1990 Eastbourne by-election. Sutch's successor as leader of the Official Monster Raving Loony Party, Alan "Howling Laud" Hope, has, as of the 2021 North Shropshire by-election, contested eighteen by-elections.

John Cartwright of the Official Monster Raving Loony Party has contested three by-elections without success, his most successful total being 188 at the 2007 Ealing Southall by-election. Under various ballot paper descriptions, David Bishop of the Church of the Militant Elvis label has stood at five by-elections, receiving 99 votes at the 2012 Corby by-election, an increase over his previous high of 93 at the 2011 Feltham and Heston by-election.

Pre-1945
Arthur Henderson was distinguished in being successful in no fewer than five by-elections in different seats, in Barnard Castle, Widnes, Newcastle upon Tyne East, Burnley, and Clay Cross.

Joseph Gibbins is the only person in modern times to gain the same seat twice in two different by-elections. He triumphed for Labour in the 1924 Liverpool West Toxteth by-election and the 1935 Liverpool West Toxteth by-election.

William O'Brien won four by-elections, in Mallow in 1883, North East Cork in 1887 and then Cork City in 1904 and 1914. On these last two occasions, he was re-elected having resigned the seat.

Prime Minister Winston Churchill contested five by-elections in his long career:
1899 Oldham by-election in which he was not elected
1908 Manchester North West by-election where he was defeated
1908 Dundee by-election where he was elected
1917 Dundee by-election where he was re-elected.
1924 Westminster Abbey by-election in which he was unsuccessful

John Wilkes won the 1757 Aylesbury by-election, and was then elected in the Middlesex by-elections of February, March and April 1769, on each occasion being subsequently expelled from the House of Commons.

Former MPs making a comeback at a by-election

Notes:

1 by-election gain lost at the subsequent general election

2 by-election gain held at the subsequent general election

Former MPs failing in a by-election
2022 Birmingham Erdington by-election: Former Labour MP for Coventry South East Dave Nellist stands for the Trade Unionist and Socialist Coalition, coming third with 2.1% of the vote.
2021 Batley and Spen by-election: Former Glasgow Kelvin, Bethnal Green and Bow, and Bradford West MP George Galloway, formerly of Labour and then Respect and now representing the Workers Party of Britain, wins 21% of the vote.
2021 Hartlepool by-election: Former Stockton South MP Paul Williams, the Labour candidate, lost the seat in the party's greatest-ever reverse while in Opposition.  Former Labour Colne Valley MP Thelma Walker also stands as an independent; and former Labour Lancaster and Wyre MP Hilton Dawson stands for the North East Party. Neither win more than 1% of the vote.
2019 Brecon and Radnorshire by-election: Previous incumbent Chris Davies runs again after being removed by a recall petition and loses the seat to the Liberal Democrats.
2019 Newport West by-election: Former Conservative Tatton MP Neil Hamilton stands for the UK Independence Party, winning 8.6% of the votes.
2016 Richmond Park by-election: Incumbent Richmond Park MP Zac Goldsmith stands as an independent Conservative to protest against a third runway at Heathrow. He loses to the Liberal Democrats.
2008 Haltemprice and Howden by-election: Former Vale of Glamorgan MP Walter Sweeney stands as an independent, winning 1% of the votes.
2005 Cheadle by-election: Stephen Day fails to regain for the Conservatives a seat he lost by only 33 votes four years previously.
1997 Winchester by-election: Gerald Malone fails to regain the seat for the Conservatives, after losing by only 2 votes six months previously.
1993 Christchurch by-election: Robert Hayward loses one of the Conservatives' safest seats to the Liberal Democrats.
1990 Eastbourne by-election: Richard Hickmet fails to defend the seat for the Conservatives, after publicly stating that for electors not to support him would be a moral victory for the Provisional Irish Republican Army.
1989 Pontypridd by-election: Tom Ellis, former Labour and SDP MP, stands for the Social and Liberal Democrats, losing his deposit.
1986 Fermanagh and South Tyrone by-election: Owen Carron fails to regain the seat for Sinn Féin that he held 1981–83.
1982 Peckham by-election: Dick Taverne, former Labour and Democratic Labour MP, stands for the SDP, fails to take Labour seat.
1982 Gower by-election: Gwynoro Jones, former Labour MP, stands for the SDP, fails to take Labour seat.
1982 Beaconsfield by-election: Paul Tyler fails for the Liberals in a by-election held during the Falklands War.
1981 Warrington by-election: Roy Jenkins narrowly fails to win for the SDP from Labour in its first parliamentary contest.
April 1981 Fermanagh and South Tyrone by-election: Harry West fails to regain his old seat against Bobby Sands
1978 Hamilton by-election: Margo MacDonald fails to repeat the SNP's 1967 triumph.
1978 Ilford North by-election: Thomas Iremonger, who had sat for the seat 1954–74, stands as an independent Conservative, winning a mere 1.5% of the vote.
1977 Birmingham Stechford by-election: Terry Davis loses a safe Labour seat.
1976 Walsall North by-election: David Winnick loses a safe Labour seat.
1971 Liverpool Scotland by-election: Peter Mahon stands as an Independent Labour Anti-Abortion candidate, securing 10.3% of the vote.
1969 Brighton Pavilion by-election: Thomas Skeffington-Lodge stands for Labour in a safe Conservative seat, 19 years after losing his seat.
1967 Nuneaton by-election: Air Vice-Marshal Donald Bennett stands as a National Party candidate, 22 years after losing his seat as a Liberal MP. 
1965 Salisbury by-election: Horace Trevor-Cox stands as an independent Conservative, 20 years after losing his seat.
1965 Leyton by-election: Patrick Gordon Walker narrowly loses a supposed safe seat.
1962 South Dorset by-election: Angus Maude narrowly loses.
1960 Bolton East by-election: Frank Byers stands for the Liberals.
1956 Hereford by-election: Frank Owen fails to regain for the Liberals the seat he previously sat for 1929–1931.
1956 Mid Ulster by-election: Michael O'Neill fails to regain the seat, a year after retiring as its MP.
1948 Croydon North by-election: Air Vice-Marshal Donald Bennett stands for the Liberals, losing his deposit, and Harold Nicolson, for Labour, but fail to take a Conservative seat three years after both lost their respective seats.
1941 Hornsey by-election, 1941 Hampstead by-election and two others: Noel Pemberton Billing fails to take a seat, 20 years after standing down as an independent MP.
1924 Westminster Abbey by-election: Winston Churchill narrowly fails to take the seat, as a Constitutionalist.
1923 Anglesey by-election: Edward Thomas John failed to defend the seat.
1921 Woolwich East by-election: Ramsay MacDonald loses a supposed safe Labour seat.
1921 Westminster Abbey by-election: Arnold Lupton failed to take a Conservative seat, coming third, ten years after standing down.
1921 Cardiganshire by-election: W. Llewelyn Williams defeated in this race, as anti-Coalition Liberal contesting against a Coalition Liberal, three years after abolition of his previous seat.
1920 Dartford by-election: Thomas Edward Wing failed to defend the seat, over a year after losing his previous seat, losing it to Labour.

Re-election of Ministers
Until the Re-election of Ministers Acts 1919 and 1926 there were many cases of members having to seek re-election on appointment to ministerial office. In eight instances they were unsuccessful:
1922 Pontypridd by-election Thomas Arthur Lewis was defeated after being appointed a Junior Lord of the Treasury.
1921 Dudley by-election Sir Arthur Griffith-Boscawen was defeated after being appointed Minister of Agriculture.
1914 Ipswich by-election Charles Masterman was defeated in a subsequent attempt to return to the House of Commons.
1914 Bethnal Green South West by-election Charles Masterman was defeated after being appointed Chancellor of the Duchy of Lancaster.
1912 Manchester South by-election Sir Arthur Haworth was defeated after being appointed a Junior Lord of the Treasury.
1911 North Ayrshire by-election Andrew Macbeth Anderson was defeated after being appointed Solicitor General for Scotland.
1908 Manchester North West by-election Winston Churchill was defeated after being appointed President of the Board of Trade
1905 Brighton by-election Gerald Loder was defeated after being appointed Lord Commissioner of the Treasury

Shortest-serving by-election victors
Note this list covers completed service only; it excludes any current MPs.

Since 1945
 
 
Notes 
1 died
2 defeated at next general election
3 disqualified (Beattie was never elected. He was awarded the seat on the disqualification of his predecessor, only to be found to be disqualified himself)
4 retired at next general election (seat abolished by redistribution and failed to secure alternative seat)
5 retired at next general election due to personal difficulties
a returned to Parliament at a subsequent election
b had served previously as an MP

Pre-1945
Henry Francis Compton, Conservative 1905 New Forest by-election 46 days 2
Ronald Bell, Conservative 1945 Newport by-election 70 days 2a
Donald Bennett, Liberal 1945 Middlesbrough West by-election 73 days 2
John Dumphreys, Conservative 1909 Bermondsey by-election 83 days 2
Seaborne Davies, Liberal 1945 Caernarvon Boroughs by-election 91 days 2
Ruth Dalton, Labour 1929 Bishop Auckland by-election 92 days 3
Joseph Ormond Andrews, Liberal 1905 Barkston Ash by-election 97 days 2
Dr Robert McIntyre, SNP 1945 Motherwell by-election 104 days 2
George Knox Anderson, Conservative 1918 Canterbury by-election 113 days 3
Herbert Evans, Labour 1931 Gateshead by-election 121 days 1
Andrew Clarke, Labour 1929 Midlothian and Peebles Northern by-election 121 days 2b
Sir Henry Wilson, Unionist February 1922 North Down by-election 121 days 5
Joseph Henderson, Labour 1931 Manchester Ardwick by-election 135 days 2a
Evan Cotton, Liberal 1918 Finsbury East by-election 151 days 2
David Hardie, Labour 1931 Rutherglen by-election 159 days 2
Lord Arthur Hill, Unionist 1907 West Down by-election 193 days 7b
Oswald Cawley, Liberal January 1918 Prestwich by-election 202 days 1
Francis Norie-Miller, Liberal National 1935 Perth by-election 212 days 3
George Banton, Labour 1922 Leicester East by-election 230 days 2a
William Henry Somervell, Liberal 1918 Keighley by-election 232 days 2
Noel Edward Buxton, Liberal 1905 Whitby by-election 238 days 2a
Leslie Orme Wilson, Conservative 1922 Portsmouth South by-election 243 days 7b
Leah Manning, Labour 1931 Islington East by-election 250 days 2a
Frederick William Gibbins, Liberal 1910 Mid Glamorgan by-election 253 days 3
C. V. F. Palmer, Independent February 1920 The Wrekin by-election 261 days 1
Maurice Healy, Ind. Nationalist 1909 Cork City by-election 262 days 2ab
John Edward Sutton, Labour 1922 Manchester Clayton by-election 270 days 2ab
James Chuter Ede, Labour 1923 Mitcham by-election 278 days 2a
J. J. Cleary, Labour 1935 Liverpool Wavertree by-election 281 days 2
Sir William Beveridge, Liberal 1944 Berwick-upon-Tweed by-election 282 days 2
W. P. Sidney, Conservative 1944 Chelsea by-election 288 days 4
Sir John Reith, National February 1940 Southampton by-election 293 days 6
W. E. Gibbons, Conservative 1944 Bilston by-election 309 days 2
Lord Charles Beresford, Conservative 1902 Woolwich by-election 320 days 7ab
Arthur Henderson, Labour 1923 Newcastle-upon-Tyne East by-election 323 days 2ab
James Henry Hall, Labour 1930 Whitechapel and St Georges by-election 328 days 2a
Thomas Naylor, Labour 1921 Southwark South East by-election 336 days 2a
1 died
2 defeated at next general election
3 retired at next general election
4 retired at next general election, upon succession to a peerage
5 assassinated by IRA
6 elevated to the Peerage
7 resigned
a returned to Parliament at a subsequent election
b had served previously as an MP

Youngest by-election victors
 Esmond Harmsworth, elected on 15 November 1919 from Isle of Thanet aged 21 years 170 days.
 Youngest woman: Bernadette Devlin, elected on 17 April 1969 from Mid Ulster aged 21 years 359 days.

Babies of the House elected at by-elections

See Baby of the House of Commons

Oldest by-election victors

Debuts in Parliament:

John Benbow was 75 or 76 when he held the 1844 Dudley by-election for the Conservatives.
Hucks Gibbs was 71 when he held the April 1891 City of London by-election for the Conservatives.
Philip Manfield was 71 or 72 when he held the 1891 Northampton by-election for the Liberals.
Sir Robert Pullar was 79 (less 6 days) when he held the 1907 Perth by-election for the Liberals.
David Cleghorn Hogg was 73 when he gained the 1913 Londonderry City by-election for the Liberals.
Sir Swire Smith was 73 when he held the 1915 Keighley by-election for the Liberals.
William Frederick Hicks Beach was 74 when he held the 1916 Tewkesbury by-election for the Conservatives.
Sir George Reid was 70 when he held the 1916 St George's, Hanover Square by-election for the Conservatives. He was a former Prime Minister of Australia.
Sir John Fleming was 69 or 70 when he held the 1917 Aberdeen South by-election for the Liberals.
George Edwards was almost 70 when he gained the 1920 South Norfolk by-election for Labour. He was a former agricultural labourer.
Henry Bruce Armstrong was almost 77 when he held the 1921 Mid Armagh by-election for the Ulster Unionists.
William Nathaniel Jones was 70 when he held the 1928 Carmarthen by-election for the Liberals.
Francis Norie-Miller was 76 when he gained the 1935 Perth by-election for the Liberal Nationals.
James Little was 70 when he held the 1939 Down by-election for the Ulster Unionists.
John Evans was 70 when he held the 1946 Ogmore by-election for Labour.

Comebacks to Parliament:

John Blaquiere was 71 when he held the June 1803 Downton by-election for the Tories. He was previously MP for Rye in 1801–02.
Bartholomew Bouverie was 73 when he held the 1826 Downton by-election for the Tories. He was previously MP for the same seat from 1819 until the general election earlier in 1826.
Quintin Dick was 71 when he held the 1848 Aylesbury by-election for the Conservatives. He was previously MP for Maldon in 1830–47.
James William Freshfield was 77 when he won the 1851 Boston by-election for the Conservatives. He was previously MP for Penryn and Falmouth in 1835–41.
William Johnson Fox was 71 when he held the 1857 Oldham by-election for the Liberals. He was previously MP for the same seat from 1852 until the general election earlier in 1857.
William Cubitt was 71 when he held the 1862 Andover by-election for the Conservatives. He was previously MP for the same seat in 1847–61.
John Morgan Cobbett was 71 when he won the 1872 Oldham by-election for the Conservatives. He had been previously MP for the same seat as a Liberal in 1852–65.
James Patrick Mahon was 79 when he held the 1879 Clare by-election and 87 when he held the 1887 County Carlow by-election for the Irish Nationalists.
Isaac Holden was 75 when he held the 1882 West Riding of Yorkshire by-election for the Liberals. He had previously been MP for Knaresborough in 1865–68.
Sir Wilfrid Lawson was 74 when he held the 1903 Camborne by-election for the Liberals. He had previously been MP for Cockermouth in 1886–1900.
John Frederick Cheetham was 70 when he won the 1905 Stalybridge by-election for the Liberals. He had served previously as MP for North Derbyshire 1880-85 prior to that seat's abolition.
Sir Alfred Hopkinson was 74 when he won the 1926 Combined English Universities by-election for the Conservatives. He had previously been MP for Cricklade 1895-98 before resigning.
Arthur Salter was 70 when he held the 1951 Ormskirk by-election for the Conservatives. He had served previously as MP for Oxford University 1937-50 prior to that seat's abolition.

In defence of a previously held seat:

Enoch Powell was 73 when he successfully defended his seat at the 1986 South Down by-election for the Ulster Unionists, after a protest resignation against the Anglo-Irish Agreement, although he had been an MP almost continuously since 1950.

First women by-election victors
The first woman to be elected in a by-election was Nancy Astor, who succeeded her husband at the 1919 Plymouth Sutton by-election, becoming the first woman to take her seat in the House of Commons.

The first woman to gain a seat in a by-election was Susan Lawrence who won the 1926 East Ham North by-election, although she had previously sat for the same seat between 1923 and 1924.1

The first woman to gain a seat ab initio in a by-election was Jennie Lee who won the 1929 North Lanarkshire by-election, at the same time becoming the first woman Baby of the House of Commons.

Note
1 Mabel Philipson succeeded her husband at the 1923 Berwick-upon-Tweed by-election. He had been elected as a National Liberal Party candidate. She won as a Conservative so this could arguably be classed as the first gain by a woman.

First ethnic minority by-election victors
Whilst the first ethnic minority Members of Parliament were elected at general elections as early as the 1890s, it would be almost 100 years before one was returned at a by-election.

The first ethnic minority candidate to be elected in a by-election was Ashok Kumar who gained the 1991 Langbaurgh by-election for Labour.

David Lammy held the 2000 Tottenham by-election for Labour.
Mark Hendrick held the 2000 Preston by-election for Labour.
Parmjit Singh Gill gained the 2004 Leicester South by-election for the Liberal Democrats.
Seema Malhotra held the 2011 Feltham and Heston by-election for Labour, the first woman to win it.

The first by-election in which all three major-party candidates were from the ethnic minorities was the 2007 Ealing Southall by-election, held by Labour.

First by-election victors from specific religions
When the UK Parliament was established in 1801, non-Anglicans were prevented from taking their seats as MPs under the Test Act 1672. However, Methodists took communion at Anglican churches until 1795, and some continued to do so, and many Presbyterians were prepared to accept Anglican communion, thus ensuring that members of these creeds were represented in the Parliament. Some Unitarians were also elected.

The first by-election victor (and first ever MP) to be an adherent of the Eastern Orthodox Church was The Honourable Frederick North who was elected in 1792 for Banbury (to succeed his brother who had entered the House of Lords), having converted to the faith the previous year.

The first Roman Catholic by-election victor in the UK Parliament was Daniel O'Connell in the 1828 Clare by-election. He was not permitted to take his seat until the following year.

The first atheist by-election victor was Charles Bradlaugh, at the 1881 Northampton by-election. As an atheist, Bradlaugh was not allowed to swear the Oath of Allegiance, and the by-election was re-run in 1882 and 1884. Both were also won by Bradlaugh, who eventually was able to take his seat after the 1885 general election.

 David Salomons was the first Jewish by-election victor, at the 1851 Greenwich by-election.
 Terry Rooney was the first Mormon by-election victor, at the 1990 Bradford North by-election.
 Parmjit Singh Gill became the first Sikh by-election victor, at the 2004 Leicester South by-election.
 Virendra Sharma became the first Hindu by-election victor, at the 2007 Ealing Southall by-election.
 Rosena Allin-Khan was the first Muslim by-election victor, at the 2016 Tooting by-election.

Physically disabled by-election victors
Most physically disabled MPs in the history of the parliament entered in the intakes of general elections. Those known to have been disabled when entering parliament at by-elections are rarer and include:

John Horne Tooke, who lost sight of an eye in a boyhood fight, won the 1801 Old Sarum by-election.
Fulk Greville Howard, who lost sight of an eye in the Helder expedition in 1799, won the 1808 Castle Rising by-election. 
Sir William Carr Beresford, who lost sight of an eye in an accident on military service in 1786, won the 1811 County Waterford by-election.
Samuel Shepherd, increasingly deaf from 1790, won the 1814 Dorchester by-election.
Arthur MacMurrough Kavanagh, born without hands and feet, won the 1866 Wicklow County by-election.
Michael Davitt, who lost his right arm in a factory accident in 1857, won the 1882 Meath by-election, although he was disqualified from sitting because he was in prison.
Aubrey Herbert, who was almost blind from childhood, won the 1911 South Somerset by-election.
John Dugdale, who was partly deaf from childhood, won the 1941 West Bromwich by-election.
Cecil Manning, who lost his right arm in action in World War I, won the 1944 Camberwell North by-election.
Hervey Rhodes, who walked with a limp since severe wounding in World War I, won the 1945 Ashton-under-Lyne by-election.
William Rees-Davies, who lost his right arm in action in World War II, won the 1953 Isle of Thanet by-election.

By-elections losers awarded seats on disqualification of winner
Malcolm St Clair, 1961 Bristol South East by-election (resigned in 1963 to enable another by-election)
Charles Beattie, 1955 Mid Ulster by-election (he too was disqualified a few weeks later, causing another by-election)
Pre-1945: Stephen Moore, March 1875 Tipperary by-election (retired in 1880)

Two or more former MPs contest by-election 
 2021 Hartlepool by-election1 (three former MPs)
 2008 Haltemprice and Howden by-election2
 1997 Winchester by-election
 1986 Fermanagh and South Tyrone by-election
 1982 Beaconsfield by-election
 1981 Warrington by-election
 1969 Brighton Pavilion by-election
 1965 Salisbury by-election
 1956 Mid Ulster by-election
 1948 Croydon North by-election
 1933 Altrincham by-election (three former MPs)
 1930 Glasgow Shettleston by-election
 1930 Nottingham Central by-election (three former MPs)
 1928 Cheltenham by-election

1Hilton Dawson, Thelma Walker, and Paul Williams
2 Conservative MPs David Davis and Walter Sweeney

Frequency and duration records

Longest period without a by-election
The years 1998 and 2020 stand as the two in modern British history without any Westminster election. 1992, 1998, 2010 and 2020 are the four full calendar years in history without a single by-election.

Longest period between a vacancy arising and a by-election writ being moved
1941 The Wrekin by-election: 357 days. James Baldwin-Webb was presumed killed as a result of enemy action when SS City of Benares was torpedoed on 17 September 1940; the writ was moved on 9 September 1941.
1941 King's Norton by-election: 327 days. Ronald Cartland was killed in action on 29–30 May 1940. Initially posted missing, his death was not presumed until January 1941. The writ was moved on 22 April 1941.
1941 Hitchin by-election: 272 days. Sir Arnold Wilson was presumed killed in action on 31 May 1940; the writ was moved on 27 February 1941.
1969 Newcastle-under-Lyme by-election: 236 days. Stephen Swingler died on 19 February 1969; the writ was moved on 13 October 1969.
1969 Swindon by-election: 220 days. Francis Noel-Baker resigned on 7 March 1969; the writ was moved on 13 October 1969.

Longest period without a seat changing hands
The longest period without a seat changing hands in a by-election was the five years between the Conservative victories in the 1948 Glasgow Camlachie by-election and the 1953 Sunderland South by-election.

During the short Parliaments of 1910, 1950-1 and 1974 no seats changed hands in a by-election.

Longest period between by-election gains for a party
The Liberal Party endured 29 years without a single by-election gain between the 1929 Holland with Boston by-election and the 1958 Torrington by-election. It did not win a single by-election in the thirteen years between holding the 1945 Middlesbrough West by-election and gaining Torrington.

Until the 2008 Crewe and Nantwich by-election, the opposition Conservative Party had not gained a seat in almost 26 years, the last being the 1982 Mitcham and Morden by-election, which occurred during the unique circumstances of the Falklands War and the sitting Labour MP defecting to the Social Democratic Party and seeking re-election under his new party label. The Conservatives' last gain while in Opposition was 30 years previously at the 1978 Ilford North by-election.

Labour's longest lean stretch was almost 18 years, between gaining the 1939 Brecon and Radnorshire by-election and the 1957 Lewisham North by-election.1

Notes
1 The Labour Party were the official opposition in the Parliament elected in 1935, but after the major parties agreed an electoral truce on the outbreak of war in 1939, they did not contest any Conservative or Liberal seats for the remainder of the Parliament, a period of six years, and were members of the wartime coalition government between May 1940 and May 1945.
2 Notional gain: incumbent Conservative stood as UKIP. No UKIP candidate has ever defeated an incumbent of a different party
3 The UUP were also declared winners of the 1955 Mid Ulster by-election after the Sinn Féin candidate was disqualified, but the UUP candidate was also disqualified shortly after.
4 Sinn Féin have not gained a seat at a by-election since 1918. However, the Anti H-Block party, an Irish Republican group that merged into Sinn Féin, gained Fermanagh and South Tyrone in the April 1981 by-election ( ago).

Longest period between by-election holds for a party
The Conservatives did not successfully defend a single by-election in the eight years between their holds of the 1989 Richmond (Yorks) by-election and the 1997 Uxbridge by-election, losing a record 15 consecutive seats where they were the incumbents. By the time of the by-election in Uxbridge, the victor in Richmond, William Hague, had become leader of the Conservative Party.

Labour's worst run was 4 consecutive by-election losses, which has occurred three times since 1945:

 between holding the 1976 Newcastle-upon-Tyne Central by-election and the 1977 Grimsby by-election.
 between holding the 1967 Manchester Gorton by-election and the 1968 Sheffield Brightside by-election.
 between holding the 1967 Rhondda West by-election and the 1967 Manchester Gorton by-election.

Longest period between by-election losses for a party
Between the 1988 Glasgow Govan by-election and the 2003 Brent East by-election, Labour successfully defended every seat it held at by-elections, for a total of 30 holds (not counting Falkirk West and West Bromwich West, represented by a Labour MP turned independent and a Labour speaker respectively and both won by Labour). However, they only defended 3 seats in that time.

Since their formation, the Liberal Democrats have held every Lib Dem seat contested at a by-election, of which there have been 3. Including their successor parties, their most recent by-election loss was the 1982 Mitcham and Morden by-election, lost by the SDP  ago. The SDP candidate had however defected from Labour – the last seat lost by either party that had been won at a previous election was the 1957 Carmarthen by-election, lost by the Liberals  ago. Since 1982, the Liberal Democrats and predecessors together have defended 4; since 1957 they have defended 5 seats.

By-elections in seats held by minor and nationalist parties are rare, and so most have never lost a seat – the DUP and Plaid Cymru have defended but never lost a seat at a by-election, Sinn Féin have only lost seats by disqualification, and the UUP have never lost more than one seat in a row. No by-election has ever been called in an SDLP held seat.

Longest period without an opposition gain
For a period of 11 years, until the 2008 Crewe and Nantwich by-election, the principal opposition Conservative Party failed to register a by-election gain against the incumbent Labour Government. This is the longest period of such failure since records began, and more than twice the previous record of the five years it took the then Labour opposition to gain the 1957 Lewisham North by-election. The present Labour opposition did not register a gain for over nine years, between the 2012 Corby by-election and the 2022 Wakefield by-election

Apart from the brief parliaments of 1910, 1950-1 and 1974, the parliaments of 1951-5 and 1997-2001 are the only occasions when the Government did not lose a by-election.

Most by-elections in one day
The largest number of by-elections held on a single day occurred on 23 January 1986 when 15 simultaneous contests were held in Northern Ireland. The elections had been engineered by the incumbent Unionist parties as a protest against the Anglo-Irish Agreement of 1985. They intended the results to be interpreted as a referendum on the treaty. The elections were boycotted by the main Nationalist parties except in four seats where they had a reasonable prospect of victory. In the event, the Social Democratic and Labour Party gained one seat, Newry and Armagh, from the Ulster Unionist Party.

Apart from the above example, it is common for UK mainland parties to schedule several by-elections on the same day. Motivations include attempting to divide opponents' resources and getting bad news (expected losses) out of the way. Since 1945, the largest number of simultaneous mainland by-elections has been 6, held on 16 November 1960. On four occasions, 5 by-elections have been held on the same day, most recently on 9 June 1994. Groupings of two or three are very common.

Before November 2012, the last day on which three by-elections had been held was 23 November 2000. In November 2012 there were two such groupings of three (15 November and 29 November). The last time there were six by-elections in one calendar month was in June 1994.

Most by-election losses in one day
The largest number of by-elections lost on a single day is three, when the Labour party lost Acton, Dudley and Meriden on 28 March 1968, all to the Conservatives.

Occasions since 1945 when two seats have fallen are:

Seats with more than one by-election in a single Parliament
Bootle: May and November 1990.
Fermanagh and South Tyrone: April and August 1981.
Bristol South East: 1961 and 1963.
Mid Ulster: 1955 and 1956.
Edinburgh East: 1945 and 1947.
Middlesbrough West: 1940 and 1945.
Combined Scottish Universities: 1936, 1938 and 1945.
Berwick-upon-Tweed: 1941 and 1944.
Clay Cross: 1936 and 1944.
West Derbyshire: 1938 and 1944.
Buckingham: 1937 and 1943.
Manchester Gorton: 1937 and 1942.
Dunbartonshire: 1936 and 1941.
Greenock: 1936 and 1941.
Doncaster: 1938 and 1941.
Southampton: February and November 1940.
Preston: 1936 and 1940.
Wandsworth Central: 1937 and 1940.
City of London: 1938 and 1940.
Combined Scottish Universities: 1934 and 1935.
Eastbourne: 1932 and 1935.
Twickenham: 1932 and 1934.
Portsmouth South: 1922 and 1923.
North Down: 1921, February and July 1922.
West Down: 1921 and 1922.
South Londonderry: 1921 and 1922.
Louth: 1920 and 1921.
The Wrekin: February and November 1920.
Londonderry North: 1919 and 1922.
Prestwich: January and October 1918.
Edinburgh and St Andrews Universities: 1916 and 1917.
St George's Hanover Square: 1913, 1916 and 1918.
Portsmouth: 1912 and 1916.
City of London: February and June 1906.
Oswestry: 1901 and 1904.
Southport: 1898 and 1899.
City of London: April and June 1891.
Buckingham: 1889 and 1891.
Ayr Burghs: 1888 and 1890.
Northampton: 1881, 1882 and 1884.
Preston: 1881 and February and November 1882.
Bath: May, June and October 1873.
South Shropshire: 1866 and 1867.
East Gloucestershire: January and December 1854.
Greenwich: 1851 and 1852.
South Nottinghamshire: 1848 and 1852.
Buckinghamshire: 1837 and 1839 and 1842 and 1845, within two successive parliaments.

Other seats with by-elections less than five years apart
 Batley and Spen: 2016 and 2021
Hemsworth: 1991 and 1996.
Upper Bann: 1986 and 1990.
Belfast South: 1982 and 1986.
Fermanagh and South Tyrone: August 1981 and 1986.
Nuneaton: 1965 and 1967.
Ormskirk: 1951 and 1953.
Liverpool Wavertree: 1931 and 1935.
Twickenham: 1929, 1932 and 1934.
Westminster Abbey: 1921 and 1924.

By-election days
British Parliamentary elections are invariably held on a Thursday. The last by-election not held on a Thursday was the 1978 Hamilton by-election, held on Wednesday 31 May due to a World Cup opening match on the Thursday evening.

Due to an administrative oversight, the 1973 Manchester Exchange by-election was held on Wednesday 27 June 1973. Prior to that, the last by-elections not held on a Thursday were the 1965 Saffron Walden by-election held on Tuesday 23 March, and the 1965 Roxburgh, Selkirk and Peebles by-election held the following day.

Until the mid-1960s, it was common to hold by-elections on any day of the week (other than Sunday).

Countermanded poll
Very occasionally, a scheduled by-election may be overtaken by the calling of a general election and the dissolution of Parliament, in which case the poll is countermanded by the Returning Officer. There have been only three occasions since 1918: a by-election was scheduled to take place in Warwick and Leamington on 21 November 1923, but was cancelled by a dissolution of Parliament on 16 November. A by-election was scheduled to poll between 13 and 17 October 1924 in London University but was cancelled by a dissolution of Parliament on 9 October. In 2017 the Manchester Gorton by-election was cancelled by a Motion in the House of Commons following the calling of the 2017 United Kingdom general election.

Seats left vacant
Occasionally seats are left vacant for a substantial period.

No by-election writ was moved for any seat held by Sinn Féin after the 1918 general election. Four Sinn Féin candidates were elected in two different seats and would have had to decline one of them if they had wanted to take their seats. They were Éamon de Valera (East Clare and East Mayo), Arthur Griffith (East Cavan and North West Tyrone), Eoin MacNeill (Londonderry City and National University of Ireland) and Liam Mellowes (East Galway and North Meath).

By the end of the Parliament, the following Sinn Féin MPs had died without being replaced: Pierce McCan (East Tipperary) of influenza on 6 March 1919, Terence MacSwiney (Mid Cork) following a hunger strike in Brixton prison on 25 October 1920, Frank Lawless (North Dublin) as a result of a riding injury on 16 April 1922, Joseph McGuinness (Longford) on 31 May 1922, Cathal Brugha (Waterford) in action during the Irish Civil War on 7 July 1922, Harry Boland (South Roscommon) shot while being arrested on 2 August 1922, Arthur Griffith (East Cavan and North West Tyrone) on 12 August 1922, and Michael Collins (South Cork assassinated on 22 August 1922). In each case their seats were abolished in 1922 as a result of the establishment of the Irish Free State.

Other than these cases the longest time a seat has been left vacant with no by-election held is when Dennis Vosper was elevated to the Peerage on 20 April 1964, and no writ was moved by the time Parliament was dissolved on 25 September 1964.

Causes of by-elections

By-elections prompted by assassination

By-elections prompted by suicide

Note
1Death by hunger strike.

By-elections prompted by accidental death
2014 Heywood and Middleton by-election: Jim Dobbin died from alcohol poisoning.
2000 Romsey by-election: Michael Colvin was killed by a house fire.
1994 Eastleigh by-election: Stephen Milligan accidentally choked himself while attempting autoerotic asphyxia.
1994 Bradford South by-election: Bob Cryer was killed in a car crash.
1987 Truro by-election: David Penhaligon was killed in a car crash.
1980 Glasgow Central by-election: Thomas McMillan died from injuries received in falling from a bus.
1963 Rotherham by-election: Jack Jones was killed in a car crash.
1959 South West Norfolk by-election: Sidney Dye was killed in a car crash.
1958 Islington North by-election: Wilfred Fienburgh was killed in a car crash.
1957 Ipswich by-election: Richard Stokes died from injuries received in a car crash.
1953 North Down by-election: Sir Walter Smiles was killed in the MV Princess Victoria disaster during the storm surge.
1952 Dundee East by-election: Thomas Cook was killed in a car crash.
1948 Edmonton by-election: Evan Durbin was drowned while swimming.
1948 Stirling and Falkirk by-election: Joseph Westwood was killed in a car crash.
1948 Armagh by-election: Sir William Allen died from injuries received in a road accident.
1947 Liverpool Edge Hill by-election: Dr Richard Clitherow died due to an overdose of barbiturates after he had been "run down and jaded".
1947 Jarrow by-election: Ellen Wilkinson was killed by an accidental overdose of medication.
1946 Glasgow Cathcart by-election: Francis Beattie was killed in a car crash.
1945 Smethwick by-election: Alfred Dobbs was killed in a car crash.
1945 Motherwell by-election: James Walker was killed in a road accident.
1944 Bury St Edmunds by-election: Lieut-Col. Frank Heilgers was killed in a train crash.
1942 Manchester Clayton by-election: John Jagger was killed in a motorcycle accident.
1939 Stretford by-election: Anthony Crossley was killed in an air crash.
1933 Hitchin by-election: Viscount Knebworth was killed in a plane crash.

By-elections prompted by posthumous election of MP
1945 Bromley by-election: Sir Edward Taswell Campbell died before his election declaration at the 1945 general election.
1945 Monmouth by-election: Leslie Pym died before his election declaration at the 1945 general election.
1935 Combined Scottish Universities by-election: Noel Skelton died before his election declaration at the 1935 general election.
1906 North Galway by-election: Thomas Higgins died before his election declaration at the 1906 general election.

By-elections prompted by scandal
2022 City of Chester by-election: Chris Matheson resigned after being suspended for serious sexual misconduct.
2022 Tiverton and Honiton by-election: Neil Parish resigned after admitting watching pornography in the House of Commons.
2022 Wakefield by-election: Imran Ahmad Khan resigned after his conviction of sexual assault on a 15-year-old boy.
2021 North Shropshire by-election: Owen Paterson resigned amid controversy surrounding a report by the Parliamentary Commissioner for Standards that found that him broken paid advocacy rules.
2021 Hartlepool by-election: Mike Hill resigned in advance of an employment tribunal verdict that he had assaulted, harassed and victimised a parliamentary worker.
2019 Brecon and Radnorshire by-election: the seat was declared vacant after Chris Davies pleaded guilty to filing false expenses claims, and a recall petition was successful.
2019 Peterborough by-election: the seat was declared vacant after Fiona Onasanya was convicted of perverting the course of justice in relation to motoring penalty points issued in 2017. This was the first successful recall petition under the provisions of the Recall of MPs Act 2015.
2018 West Tyrone by-election: Barry McElduff resigned after becoming embroiled in a social media controversy.
2014 Newark by-election: Patrick Mercer resigned after being suspended from the House of Commons for six months by the Parliamentary Standards Committee for asking parliamentary questions in exchange for money.
2013 Eastleigh by-election: Chris Huhne resigned after pleading guilty to perverting the course of justice in relation to persuading his wife to accept motoring penalty points in 2003.
2012 Rotherham by-election: Denis MacShane resigned after House of Commons Standards and Privileges Committee recommended he be suspended from the service of the House for twelve months; their inquiry arose from the United Kingdom Parliamentary expenses scandal.
2011 Barnsley Central by-election: Eric Illsley resigned after pleading guilty to charges of false accounting arising from the United Kingdom Parliamentary expenses scandal.
2009 Glasgow North East by-election: Michael Martin resigned as Speaker rather than face a vote of no-confidence, amid criticism of his actions arising from the United Kingdom Parliamentary expenses scandal.
2009 Norwich North by-election: Ian Gibson resigned after being debarred as a Labour candidate, due to allegations arising from the United Kingdom Parliamentary expenses scandal.
1997 Beckenham by-election: Piers Merchant resigned after a newspaper story revealed that his previous denials of an affair were lies.
1977 Bournemouth East by-election: John Cordle resigned after he was criticised by a Select Committee for business links to corrupt architect John Poulson.
1976 Walsall North by-election: John Stonehouse resigned after being convicted of insurance fraud.
1973 Berwick-upon-Tweed by-election: Antony Lambton resigned after his visits to prostitutes and use of cannabis were exposed by the News of the World.
1963 Stratford-upon-Avon by-election: John Profumo resigned after his denials of an affair with Christine Keeler were shown to be lies.
1959 Harrow East by-election: Ian Harvey resigned after conviction for gross indecency with a guardsman in Hyde Park.
1953 Paddington North by-election: Bill Field resigned after conviction for importuning for immoral purposes in a public lavatory.
1949 Sowerby by-election: John Belcher resigned after being found to have accepted gifts from businessmen for political favours.
1941 Scarborough and Whitby by-election: Sir Paul Latham resigned after he was arrested to be tried by court-martial on 13 charges of disgraceful conduct.
1936 Derby by-election: James Henry Thomas resigned after being found to have disclosed budget secrets.
1936 Balham and Tooting by-election: Sir Alfred Butt resigned after being found to have disclosed budget secrets.
1931 Pontypridd by-election: Thomas Mardy Jones resigned after being found to have abused a travel voucher.
1926 Buckrose by-election: Guy Gaunt resigned after being cited as co-respondent in a divorce case.

By-elections prompted to provide seat for seat-less personality
1965 Nuneaton by-election: For Frank Cousins.
1965 Leyton by-election: For Patrick Gordon-Walker (defeated).
1950 Sheffield Neepsend by-election: For Frank Soskice.
February 1940 Southampton by-election: For Sir John Reith.
1940 Wandsworth Central by-election: For Ernest Bevin.
1922 Portsmouth South by-election: For Leslie Orme Wilson.
February 1906 City of London by-election: For Arthur Balfour.
1896 Montrose Burghs by-election: For John Morley.

By-elections prompted by party disputes and defections
By-elections are ostensibly to vote for a 'person', not a 'party', meaning that a member switching parties mid-term is not cause for a by-election. However, some members do seek re-election under their new party as a point of principle.

By-elections resulting from Members resigning on principle
2016 Richmond Park by-election: Zac Goldsmith resigned to force a by-election on the issue of the expansion of Heathrow Airport, and contested as an Independent. He was defeated by Sarah Olney of the Liberal Democrats. Goldsmith later regained his seat the following year at the 2017 general election.
2008 Haltemprice and Howden by-election: David Davis resigned to force a by-election on the issue of civil liberties. He was re-elected with neither of the other main parties contesting the seat.
1986 Northern Ireland by-elections: Fifteen Unionist MPs resigned and re-contested their seats in protest at the Anglo-Irish Agreement. All but one was re-elected.
1963 Bristol South East by-election: Malcolm St Clair honoured a pledge to stand down if law changed to allow Tony Benn to disclaim his peerage.
1938 Kinross-shire and Perthshire by-election: The Duchess of Atholl resigned in protest at Neville Chamberlain's appeasement policy and sought re-election. She was defeated.
1927 Southwark North by-election: Leslie Haden-Guest resigned from the Labour Party over its policy on China, and re-contested the seat as an Independent Constitutionalist with Conservative support. He was defeated, finishing bottom of the poll. The Liberals gained the seat.
1927 Leith by-election: William Wedgwood Benn resigned following his resignation from the Liberal party and joining the Labour Party. He did not contest the by-election out of fairness to the existing Labour candidate. The seat was narrowly held by a new Liberal candidate.
1914 Cork City by-election: William O'Brien resigned to submit himself to the voters after the Irish Nationalists had made council gains in Cork. He was returned unopposed.
1912 Bow and Bromley by-election: George Lansbury resigned to contest his seat on the issue of Women's Suffrage, although he was disenchanted with a range of Labour party policies. He was defeated.
1909 Stratford-on-Avon by-election: Thomas Kincaid-Smith resigned from the Liberal Party on the issue of compulsory national service. He stood as an Independent with National Service League support. He was defeated, finishing bottom of the poll.
1906 Mid Cork by-election: D. D. Sheehan resigned and re-contested his seat following his expulsion from the Irish Nationalist group for not signing the party pledge. Re-elected as an independent.

By-elections prompted by Member's desire to contest another seat
1918 East Tyrone by-election: William Redmond resigned in order to defend his late father's seat at Waterford City. He was successful.
1914 East Worcestershire by-election: Austen Chamberlain resigned in order to defend his late father's seat at Birmingham West. He was successful.
1911 East Wicklow by-election: John Muldoon resigned in order to contest the East Cork by-election. He was successful.

By-elections caused by the previous result being declared void

2011 Oldham East and Saddleworth by-election: The result of the 2010 general election was declared void because the victor was found guilty of knowingly making false statements about a rival candidate.
1997 Winchester by-election: The result of the 1997 general election was declared void because ballot papers which had not received the official mark would have affected the result, if counted. Liberal Democrat Mark Oaten massively increased the minute majority he had achieved in the general election.
1924 Oxford by-election: The result of the 1923 general election was declared void because there were irregularities in the election expenses of the successful candidate.
1923 Berwick-upon-Tweed by-election: The result of the 1922 general election was declared void because there were irregularities in the election expenses of the successful candidate.
1911 North Louth by-election: The result of the December 1910 general election was declared void because of corrupt practices and bribery on the part of the successful candidate.

By-elections prompted by disqualification of the sitting Member
1961 Bristol South East by-election: Tony Benn had inherited a Peerage from his father. Although by-elections were routinely called where Members had succeeded to the Peerage, the seat was not considered vacated until the Member had received a Writ of Summons to the House of Lords, and Benn, who refused to accept the Peerage, did not apply for one. The seat was declared vacant by a resolution of the House of Commons.
1956 Mid Ulster by-election: Charles Beattie was found to be disqualified through membership of National Assistance panels. A bill indemnifying him from the consequences of acting as an MP while disqualified was passed by the House of Commons; Beattie did not stand in the by-election. 
1955 Mid Ulster by-election: Tom Mitchell was disqualified as a felon (resolution of the House).
1950 Belfast West by-election: Rev James Godfrey MacManaway was found by the Judicial Committee of the Privy Council to be disqualified, as a Minister of the Church of Ireland.
1925 Walsall by-election: William Preston was found to be disqualified owing to his holding government contracts. A bill indemnifying him was passed by the House of Commons and Preston was re-elected at the by-election.
1924 Dover by-election: John Astor was disqualified for voting before he took the oath. He was returned unopposed at the by-election.
1913 Whitechapel by-election: Sir Stuart Samuel was found to be disqualified owing to his holding government contracts. A bill indemnifying him was passed by the House of Commons and Samuel was narrowly re-elected at the by-election.
1904 City of London by-election: Alban Gibbs was found to be disqualified owing to his holding government contracts. Gibbs resigned and was re-elected unopposed at the by-election.
1904 St Albans by-election: Vicary Gibbs was found to be disqualified owing to his holding government contracts. Gibbs resigned and was narrowly defeated at the by-election.

By-elections prompted by expulsion from the House
1955 South Norfolk by-election: Peter Baker was expelled after being convicted of uttering forged documents.
1947 Gravesend by-election: Garry Allighan was expelled after being found to be in extreme contempt of the House by his peers after selling details of private parliamentary meetings to the Evening Standard.
1922 Hackney South by-election: Horatio Bottomley was expelled after being convicted of fraud, perjury and false accounting.
1903 Galway Borough by-election: the seat was declared vacant after Arthur Alfred Lynch was convicted of high treason after fighting on the Boer side in the Second Boer War.

By-elections prompted by lunacy
1916 Colne Valley by-election: Charles Leach was adjudged a lunatic and his seat declared vacant.

By-elections prompted by bankruptcy
1928 Ashton-under-Lyne by-election: Cornelius Homan lost his seat after being declared bankrupt.
1922 Camberwell North by-election: Henry Newton Knights lost his seat after being declared bankrupt.
1914 North Galway by-election: Richard Hazleton resigned before being declared bankrupt. He discharged his bankruptcy and was returned in the by-election.
1912 Hackney South by-election: Horatio Bottomley resigned after filing a bankruptcy petition. 
1909 South Kilkenny by-election: Nicholas Joseph Murphy was declared bankrupt.

By-elections prompted for miscellaneous reasons
1916 Widnes by-election: William Hall Walker resigned to permit him to donate his thoroughbred racing stock to create a National Stud in an "arms-length" transaction. He was returned unopposed at the by-election.

By-elections prompted by death of member on wartime active service

Second World War
1945 Chelmsford by-election: John Macnamara was killed in action fighting in Italy.
1944 Berwick-upon-Tweed by-election: George Charles Grey was killed in action fighting in Normandy, France.
1944 Bury St Edmunds by-election: Frank Heilgers was killed in a train crash in Ilford.
1943 Acton by-election: Hubert Duggan died of tuberculosis contracted on active service. a
1943 Darwen by-election: Stuart Russell died of fever on active service in Egypt. 
1943 Chippenham by-election: Victor Cazalet was killed in a plane crash in Gibraltar while escorting General Sikorski. 
1943 Birmingham Aston by-election: Edward Orlando Kellett was killed in action fighting in North Africa. 
1943 Buckingham by-election: John Whiteley was killed in a plane crash in Gibraltar while escorting General Sikorski.
1943 Bristol Central by-election: Lord Apsley was killed in action in a plane crash in the Middle-East. 
1943 King's Lynn by-election: Somerset Maxwell died of wounds received at the Battle of El Alamein. 
1942 Salisbury by-election: James Despencer-Robertson died suddenly, apparently from overwork as military secretary at Southern Command Headquarters. b
1942 Llandaff and Barry by-election: Patrick Munro died while taking part in an exercise for the Home Guard at Westminster. 
1941 The Wrekin by-election: James Baldwin-Webb drowned when the SS City of Benares was torpedoed.
1941 Dudley by-election: Dudley Joel was killed in action while serving with the Royal Navy. 
1941 Bodmin by-election: John Rathbone was killed in action on bombing operations over Germany. 
1941 Hitchin by-election: Sir Arnold Wilson was killed in action over northern France while a gunner in Bomber Command
1941 King's Norton by-election: Ronald Cartland was killed in action during the retreat to Dunkirk. 
1940 Manchester Exchange by-election: Peter Eckersley was killed in action in a plane crash while serving with the Fleet Air Arm.
1940 Heywood and Radcliffe by-election: Richard Porritt was killed in action fighting in Belgium.
1939 Wells by-election: Anthony Muirhead committed suicide owing to his fear that a leg-injury might prevent his service in the War. b

Notes: The above list is of those members either mentioned as having died on War Service in a written Commons answer from Prime Minister Winston Churchill on 19 January 1945, or who appear in the House of Commons Book of Remembrance unveiled in 1949.

a Mentioned in the written Commons answer, but does not appear in the House of Commons Book of Remembrance.
b Not mentioned in the written Commons answer, but does appear in the House of Commons Book of Remembrance.

NB: The above list does not include the names of three members whose deaths on active service were overtaken by the 1945 general election. For a complete list see Records of members of parliament of the United Kingdom#Second World War

First World War
October 1918 Prestwich by-election: Oswald Cawley had been killed in action in France.
1918 Bath by-election: Lord Alexander Thynne had been killed in action in France.
1918 Canterbury by-election: Francis Bennett-Goldney had been killed by an on-duty car accident in France.
1918 Ross by-election: Percy Clive had been killed in action in France.
1918 Manchester South by-election: Philip Glazebrook had been killed in action in Palestine.
1917 Wisbech by-election: The Hon Neil Primrose died of wounds received in Palestine.
1917 Spalding by-election: The Hon Francis McLaren had been killed in a flying accident serving with the Royal Flying Corps.
1917 East Clare by-election: Willie Redmond had been killed in action in Belgium.
1917 Henley by-election: Valentine Fleming had been killed by shell fire in France.
1916 North Ayrshire by-election: Duncan Frederick Campbell had died in England of wounds received from a landmine on the Western Front.
1916 Winchester by-election: The Hon Guy Baring had been killed in the Battle of the Somme in France.
1916 Tewkesbury by-election: Michael Hicks Beach, Viscount Quenington had died of wounds in Egypt.
1915 St Austell by-election: The Hon Thomas Agar-Robartes had died of wounds received in the Battle of Loos in France.
1915 Cardiff by-election: Lord Ninian Crichton-Stuart had been killed in action in France.
1915 Uxbridge by-election: The Hon Charles Thomas Mills had been killed in action in France.
1915 Heywood by-election: Harold Thomas Cawley had been killed in action in the Battle of Gallipoli.
1915 Kilmarnock Burghs by-election: William Glynne Charles Gladstone had been killed in action in France.
1915 Mid Antrim by-election: The Hon Arthur O'Neill had been killed in action in the Ypres Salient in Belgium.

Miscellaneous records

Incumbents fall directly from first place to third place

1995 Littleborough and Saddleworth by-election Conservatives loss, gained by the Liberal Democrats
1995 Perth and Kinross by-election Conservative loss, gained by the SNP
1994 Eastleigh by-election Conservative loss, gained by the Liberal Democrats
1985 Brecon and Radnor by-election Conservative loss, gained by the Liberals
1982 Mitcham and Morden by-election1 Labour loss, gained by the Conservatives
1958 Rochdale by-election Conservative loss, gained by Labour
1934 Merthyr by-election ILP loss, gained by Labour
1929 Holland with Boston by-election Conservative loss, gained by the Liberals
1927 Bosworth by-election Conservative loss, gained by the Liberals
1926 Kingston upon Hull Central by-election2 Liberal loss, gained by Labour
1920 South Norfolk by-election Liberal loss, gained by Labour

1 Bruce Douglas-Mann had been re-elected as Labour MP for the seat in the 1979 general election. In 1981, along with several other MPs, he defected to the newly formed Social Democratic Party. Against his new colleagues' advice, he honoured a pledge to face his electors under his new party colours and precipitated a by-election. He came second in the by-election which was won by the Conservatives. The new Labour candidate finished third.

2 the Liberal MP, Lt-Commander the Hon. Joseph Montague Kenworthy, defected to Labour and sought re-election under his new colours. He was successful, and the new Liberal candidate lost his deposit.

Incumbent government gains seats
These records show the rare occasions when the government won a seat they had not won at the previous general election.

Notes
1 Seat awarded by Election Court to Conservative runner-up because Labour victor deemed ineligible.
2 An arguable gain; Stockport was a two-member seat; in the 1918 general election it was won by two supporters of the Coalition Government, one a Liberal and one a Labour member. After a death and a resignation, a by-election was held for both seats. The seats were again won by two Coalition Government supporters, but this time a Conservative and a Liberal, while a Labour candidate who did not support the government was unsuccessful.
3 National Liberal elected in 1922 election had his election declared void (electoral fraud). Resulting by-election was a gain for the Conservatives.
4 Uncontested gain from Irish Nationalist.
5 Liberal MP defected to Labour and was re-elected as Labour at a by-election the Liberals did not contest.
aLabour won both the 2000 West Bromwich West by-election and 2009 Glasgow North East by-election, regarded as a gain from the contest at the United Kingdom general elections in 1997 and 2005 respectively as those seats had been contested by the then Speakers of the House of Commons. Prior to assuming the Speakership they had both been elected as Labour MPs.
bThe Conservatives were in Coalition government, led by the Liberal Prime Minister, David Lloyd George.

Principal Opposition loses seats

These records show the rare occasions when the official Opposition failed to hold on to a seat they had won at the previous General election.

1A confused situation, where the victorious Empire Free Trade Crusade candidate was effectively a right-wing unofficial Conservative, who subsequently took the whip and was re-elected as official Conservative candidate.
2seat awarded by Election Court to Conservative runner-up because Labour victor Viscount Stansgate was deemed ineligible.
3Sir Owen Thomas had been elected as Independent Labour, took the whip for a while, before reverting to Independent Labour.
4Lost to Coalition Conservatives (see Coalition Coupon)

By-election holds overturned at next general election

On rare occasions a party has failed to overturn an incumbent in the by-election yet has gone on to gain the seat at the subsequent general election.

By-election victors had not contested previous general election
It is unusual for a political party which has not contested a seat at a general election to take it at a subsequent by-election. Independent candidates are not included.

Notes:

1 Alliance partner the Liberal party had contested the seat.
2 The victor was the sitting MP, who had left the Labour party.
3 Candidate endorsed by the coalition government.
4 The victor was the sitting MP, who had left the Conservative party.

Additional victories by minor parties
In addition to the above section, other minor party successes include the following. For a complete list, see the list of UK minor party and independent MPs elected.

Victory from third or lower place

 2022 Tiverton and Honiton by-election, gained by the Liberal Democrats
 2021 North Shropshire by-election, gained by the Liberal Democrats. 
 2012 Bradford West by-election, gained by Respect, from fifth place
 2004 Leicester South by-election, gained by the Liberal Democrats
 2003 Brent East by-election, gained by the Liberal Democrats
 1988 Glasgow Govan by-election, gained by the SNP, from fourth place
 1987 Greenwich by-election, gained by the SDP
 1985 Brecon and Radnor by-election, gained by the Liberals
 1983 Bermondsey by-election, gained by the Liberals
 1981 Croydon North West by-election, gained by the Liberals
 1973 Glasgow Govan by-election, gained by the SNP
 1973 Berwick-upon-Tweed by-election, gained by the Liberals
 1973 Ripon by-election, gained by the Liberals
 1972 Sutton and Cheam by-election, gained by the Liberal
 1966 Carmarthen by-election, gained by Plaid Cymru
 1962 Orpington by-election, gained by the Liberals
 1929 Holland with Boston by-election, gained by the Liberals

Incumbent party did not contest

2016 Richmond Park by-election (incumbent Conservative MP ran as an Independent with party backing)
1995 North Down by-election (Ulster Popular Unionist Party disintegrated before by-election)
1963 Bristol South East by-election (Conservative candidate awarded seat after 1961 by-election had agreed to stand aside, if law changed to permit disqualified Labour candidate to take his seat)
1942 Cardiff East by-election (Conservatives stood aside to allow election of National Government minister)
1940 City of London by-election (Conservatives stood aside to allow election of National Government minister)
February 1940 Southampton by-election (National Liberals stood aside to allow election of National Government minister)
1938 Combined Scottish Universities by-election (National Labour stood aside to allow election of National Government minister)
1936 Ross and Cromarty by-election (National Liberals stood aside to allow election of National Government minister from National Labour)
1936 Combined Scottish Universities by-election (Conservatives stood aside to allow election of National Government minister from National Labour)
1935 Perth by-election (Conservatives stood aside to allow election of National Liberal)
1929 Liverpool Scotland by-election (lone mainland Irish Nationalist was essentially a Labour supporter)
1929 Preston by-election (Liberals acquiesced to William Jowitt becoming Labour's Attorney General)

Losers had been unopposed at previous election
1930 Paddington South by-election Conservative loss, gained by Empire Free Trade Crusade.
1929 Liverpool Scotland by-election Irish Nationalist loss, gained by Labour.1
1928 Halifax by-election Speaker loss, gained by Labour.2
1921 Kirkcaldy Burghs by-election Coalition Liberal loss, gained by Labour.
1921 Woolwich East by-election Labour loss, gained by Conservative.
February 1920 The Wrekin by-election Coalition Liberal loss, gained by Independent.

Notes:
1 the Nationalists did not contest the by-election
2 the Speaker had originally been a Liberal MP.

Major party did not run

Great Britain
Labour joined the Liberal Democrats and the Greens in not contesting the 2022 Southend West by-election, out of respect following the murder of the previous MP, Sir David Amess.

The Conservatives declined to run a candidate in the 2016 Richmond Park by-election, instead backing Conservative incumbent Zac Goldsmith, who was designated as an Independent.

The Conservatives, Liberal Democrats, UKIP, and Green Party declined to run candidates in the 2016 Batley and Spen by-election, due to the circumstances regarding the killing of the previous MP, Jo Cox.

Neither the Liberal Democrat nor the Labour Party stood candidates in the 2008 Haltemprice and Howden by-election. The by-election was a single-issue election in regards to government security policy, in which the Liberal Democrats supported the Conservative candidate.

The Conservative Party did not run a candidate in the 1963 Bristol South East by-election, the 1957 Carmarthen by-election, the 1948 Paisley by-election or the 1946 Ogmore by-election.

The Labour Party did not run in the 1945 City of London by-election, the 1945 Kensington South by-election or the 1946 Combined English Universities by-election.

Prior to 2008, the last by-election without an official Liberal Democrat, Liberal or SDP candidate had been the 1994 Newham North East by-election; the Lib Dems nominated a candidate, but he joined the Labour Party before the election. No official Liberal candidate was nominated for the 1980 Glasgow Central by-election, whilst no Liberal stood in either the 1973 Westhoughton by-election or the 1973 West Bromwich by-election, both held on 24 May 1973.

The last Scottish by-elections without official Scottish National Party candidates were the 1965 Roxburgh, Selkirk and Peebles by-election and the 1964 Rutherglen by-election.

Plaid Cymru did not stand a candidate for the 2019 Brecon and Radnorshire by-election, choosing instead to endorse the Liberal Democrat candidate in a "Stop Brexit" alliance. Prior to that, the last Welsh by-elections without official Welsh Nationalist candidates were the 1950 Abertillery by-election, the 1946 Pontypool by-election and the 1945 Monmouth by-election.

Northern Ireland
The more fluid nature of politics in Northern Ireland makes it harder to define all major parties. In addition many by-elections have not been contested by parties holding other seats in the House of Commons, whether due to agreements with other parties, poor organisation in the constituency or the particular circumstances on the by-election. However, for the period since 1981 (which saw the first by-elections in twelve years, during which time several major political realignments had occurred) the main parties are usually considered to be the Democratic Unionist Party, Sinn Féin, the Social Democratic and Labour Party (SDLP) and the Ulster Unionist Party.

At the 2013 Mid Ulster by-election. a single "unity" candidate was backed by the withdrawal of the Democratic Unionist Party, Ulster Conservatives and Unionists and Traditional Unionist Voice. Prior to Mid Ulster in 2013, the most recent examples of by-elections without official Democratic Unionist candidates were the 1995 North Down by-election and the 1990 Upper Bann by-election. They also did not stand in the twelve seats held by other Unionist parties in the 15 by-elections in 1986.

The last by-election without official candidates from either Sinn Féin or the SDLP was the 1995 North Down by-election. Both parties also declined to stand in the eleven Unionist majority seats in the 15 by-elections in 1986. The SDLP also did not contest either the April or August 1981 by-elections in Fermanagh and South Tyrone.

The last by-elections without official Ulster Unionist candidates prior to Mid Ulster in 2013 were North Antrim, East Belfast, Mid Ulster and North Down in the 15 by-elections in 1986.

The main British parties have generally not stood in seats in Northern Ireland. The by-election exceptions are the 1990 Upper Bann by-election (NI Conservatives and continuing SDP) and the 1995 North Down by-election (NI Conservatives). Prior to the 1970s the Ulster Unionists were effectively the local Conservatives, whilst the Liberals contested some but not all seats. The SDLP has traditionally seen itself as a "sister party" to the British Labour party, and its MPs usually accept the Labour whip in Parliament.

Minor parties other strong performance
Parties without representation in the House of Commons which saved their deposit:

Miscellaneous notable results 
It is unusual for one of the major parties to finish outside of the top three in England and Wales (or outside of the top four in Scotland). It is also unusual for the principal opposition party to suffer a significant reverse in its share of the vote or ranking.

The 2021 Hartlepool by-election, with a 16% swing to the Conservatives, was the Labour Party's worst result in a Labour-held seat while the party was in Opposition, since the 1912 Hanley by-election. It was effectively the party's worst-ever result since it became a major party.
The 2019 Brecon and Radnorshire by-election saw Labour finish fourth behind the Liberal Democrats, Conservatives and Brexit Party. In addition, UKIP fell to last place, behind the Official Monster Raving Loony Party – a result compared to the continuing SDP's defeat in the 1990 Bootle by-election.
The 2016 Richmond Park by-election was the first Liberal Democrat gain since 2010, showing tentative signs of recovery for the party. It also gave them a female MP for the first time in the 56th parliament. In addition it was the first occasion in more than a century of Labour losing their deposit in a London by-election.
The 2014 Clacton by-election saw the election of the first UKIP MP on the largest swing ever against the Conservative Party. It was also the first time that a party had gained a seat not having contested the previous election since the 1973 Isle of Ely by-election. The Liberal Democrat's 1.4% of the vote was their worst result in an English seat since 1924.
The 2013 Eastleigh by-election delivered several records. It was the first time in an English seat that both Labour and Conservative finished outside of the top two. For the first time, UKIP came close to winning a seat. It was the closest three-cornered English by-election since the 1921 Penistone by-election, and, aside from the 1946 Combined English Universities by-election, it was won with the lowest winning share of the vote since 1918. Aside from the contrived example of the 1989 Richmond (Yorks) by-election it was also the first time Labour had finished fourth in a by-election while in Opposition.
At the 2012 Rotherham by-election, the Conservative party fell from second to fifth place (equalling its previous lowest position in a by-election in mainland Britain) while the Liberal Democrats fell from third place to eighth, the lowest ranking ever achieved by a major party in a by-election. This followed the 2011 Barnsley Central by-election, where the Liberal Democrats took sixth place, dropping from second at the 2010 general election. The Rotherham by-election was also the first recorded by-election result to have women in the top four places.
In the 2009 Glasgow North East by-election and 1999 Hamilton South by-election the Liberal Democrats came sixth in both cases, equalling the worst ever placing by a major party in the UK. In 1999 the party had 634 votes while in Glasgow the party won 474 votes.
At the 2008 Henley by-election the Labour Party finished in fifth place, the worst ranking for the party in its history, and a record low for any government in a UK mainland constituency. The lowest ever for an incumbent government was the 1990 Upper Bann by-election when the Conservatives came sixth, although they had not previously contested the seat.
At the 2006 Blaenau Gwent by-election, held on the same day as Bromley and Chislehurst, the Conservative Party's fifth-place ranking equalled the worst-place achieved by a major party in England or Wales, a feat the Conservatives had first achieved in the same seat in the 2005 general election. The Blaenau victor, Dai Davies was the first independent to hold a seat previously occupied by an independent since Sir C.V.F. Townshend held The Wrekin in 1920.
The drop in the Conservative share of the vote, 11.1%, at the 2006 Bromley and Chislehurst by-election was their worst result in a Conservative-held seat while in opposition since 19301. At the same by-election, the Labour Party's fall from second to fourth place was the first time the party had suffered such a reverse in an English seat.
The Conservative Party fell from second to fourth place in the 2004 Hartlepool by-election  and the 1983 Bermondsey by-election, and fell from third to fourth place in the 1991 Liverpool Walton by-election. At the time their worst ranking in an English by-election since at least 1945 was the drop from third place to fourth place in the 1974 Newham South by-election.
The Labour party fell from second to fourth place in the 2000 Ceredigion by-election.
At the Bootle by-election, 1990 the "continuing" SDP finished seventh out of eight candidates, behind the Monster Raving Loony Party, in a seat parts of which had once been in adjoining Crosby, scene of the party's greatest triumph only eight years previously.
The Labour Party achieved fourth place in the 1989 Richmond (Yorks) by-election although this was contrived somewhat by the Social and Liberal Democrats and Social Democratic Party parties running separate candidates.
At the 1976 Walsall North by-election, the Liberal Party could take only fifth place. Beaten by an independent and a minor party candidate, at the time, this was the worst placing for any major party in an English by-election since at least 1945.
The last time the Liberals lost a by-election they were defending was at the 1957 Carmarthen by-election, defeated by the former Liberal MP turned Labour candidate, Lady Megan Lloyd George. The Liberal parliamentary contingent was thus reduced to five MPs, its lowest ever level.

Notes
1Excluding the 1931 Westminster St George's by-election and the 1930 Paddington South by-election, which were essentially intra-Conservative contests, the previous worst result was, ironically, the 1930 Bromley by-election

By-elections having national significance
2022 Tiverton and Honiton by-election and 2022 Wakefield by-election: A pair of by-election losses for the government on the same day – one in a rural area represented by the Conservatives since 1923 and one in a recently won "Red Wall" seat – triggered the resignation of Oliver Dowden as Chairman of the Conservative Party and contributed to the pressure on Prime Minister Boris Johnson that led to the collapse of his government two weeks later.
2017 Copeland by-election: A Conservative win in a previously safe Labour seat confirmed the party's strong opinion poll lead and prompted an early election.
2016 Richmond Park by-election: After losing most of its seats in the 2015 general election, a Lib Dem gain on a large swing in a strongly Remain seat marked the beginning of a turnaround for the party and demonstrated the political effects of Brexit.
2014 Clacton by-election: The first by-election victory for the UK Independence Party
2008 Crewe and Nantwich by-election: A Conservative gain (from Labour in this case) at a by-election for the first time since 1982, and the first time as an opposition party since 1978, demonstrated the Conservatives were back in contention to possibly win the next general election.
2003 Brent East by-election: A Lib Dem gain of a Labour safe seat on a 29% swing demonstrated the political effect of public dissatisfaction with the Iraq War. 
1997 Wirral South by-election: A Labour gain on a large swing just weeks before a general election confirmed the move in the party's favour was real and meant the Conservatives became a minority government.
1991 Liverpool Walton by-election: The Militant group, as Walton Real Labour, opposed a Labour candidate for the first time; their showing led to the decision to re-organise as Militant Labour without using entryist tactics.
May 1990 Bootle by-election: Abysmal showing of the 'continuing SDP' led to the party being wound up.
1987 Greenwich by-election: Defeat of a left-wing Labour candidate demonstrated the party's vulnerability.
1983 Darlington by-election: Labour's successful defence of a marginal seat stabilised the party, and secured the position of Leader Michael Foot.
1981 Crosby by-election: Victory of the Social Democratic Party in a rock-solid Conservative seat showed the national appeal of the party.
April 1981 Fermanagh and South Tyrone by-election: Election of Maze prison hunger-striker Bobby Sands demonstrated that nationalist voters could support violent Republican candidates; taken by the Republican movement as a vindication of their stance, it led to the return of Sinn Féin as a major force in Northern Irish politics.
1977 Birmingham Stechford by-election: The loss of the seat to the Conservatives tipped Labour under James Callaghan into minority government status, necessitating the Lib–Lab pact.
1967 Hamilton by-election: Scottish National Party victory massively boosted the prospects of the party.
1966 Kingston upon Hull North by-election: Easy Labour victory in a marginal seat demonstrated to Prime Minister Harold Wilson that he would probably win a snap general election, and led to the construction of the Humber Bridge.
1965 Roxburgh, Selkirk and Peebles by-election: Rare Conservative loss in Opposition leads to resignation of leader Sir Alec Douglas-Home and election of Edward Heath as first democratically elected Conservative leader.
1965 Leyton by-election: Foreign Secretary Patrick Gordon-Walker, who was found the seat after losing Smethwick in 1964, is again defeated; he is forced to resign from the Government.
1963 Kinross and Western Perthshire by-election: Prime Minister Sir Alec Douglas-Home successfully returned to the House of Commons after disclaiming his peerage.
1962 Orpington by-election: A Liberal gain in a suburban seat led to a national revival for the party.
1961 Bristol South East by-election: Incumbent Labour MP Tony Benn re-elected after inheriting a peerage; the seat was awarded to the defeated Conservative, but the circumstances led to the Peerage Act 1963 allowing hereditary peerages to be disclaimed.
1938 Oxford by-election: After a campaign dominated by appeasement and the Munich agreement, the government candidate won.
1935 Liverpool Wavertree by-election: Intervention of Independent Conservative Randolph Churchill, on platform of rearmament and anti-Indian Home Rule, hands safe seat to Labour on largest ever swing (30%). Indication of hostility to National Government, and Prime Minister Ramsay MacDonald resigns within months.
1933 Fulham East by-election: Unexpected Labour gain in a previously safe Conservative constituency, ascribed to pacifism.
1922 Newport by-election: Election of an anti-Coalition Conservative in a tight three-way contest spurred on Conservative MPs to end their coalition with David Lloyd George.
1920 Dartford by-election: massive swing to Labour prefigures the party's eclipse of the Liberals.

Firsts and lasts 
Last Labour gain at a by-election: 2022 Wakefield by-election
Last Liberal Democrat gain at a by-election: 2022 Tiverton and Honiton by-election
Last Conservative gain in a by-election: 2021 Hartlepool by-election
First by-election to be called via the provisions of the Recall of MPs Act 2015: 2019 Peterborough by-election
First UK Independence Party gain at a by-election: 2014 Clacton by-election
Last UK Independence Party gain at a by-election: 2014 Rochester and Strood by-election 
First by-election gain by a Northern Ireland party: 1943 Belfast West by-election (Northern Ireland Labour Party from Ulster Unionist Party)
Last by-election gain by a Northern Ireland party: 2000 South Antrim by-election (Democratic Unionist Party from Ulster Unionist Party)
First by-election gain by the Social Democratic Party (SDP): 1981 Crosby by-election
Last by-election gain by the Social Democratic Party (SDP): 1987 Greenwich by-election
Last by-election gain by the Liberal Party: 1986 Ryedale by-election
First by-election gain by the Scottish National Party: 1945 Motherwell by-election
Last by-election gain by the Scottish National Party: 2008 Glasgow East by-election
First and last by-election gain by Plaid Cymru: 1966 Carmarthen by-election
First by-election in which 18 year olds could vote, and party labels were included on the ballot: 1970 Bridgwater by-election
Last unopposed by-election in England, Scotland or Wales: 1946 Hemsworth by-election
Last by-election in a university constituency: 1946 Combined Scottish Universities by-election
Last by-election caused by appointment to ministerial office: 1926 East Renfrewshire by-election
Last by-election from what was to become the Irish Free State: 1919 Dublin University by-election
Last double member by-election: 1920 Stockport by-election
Last by-election result to be declared undue: 1961 Bristol South East by-election
Last by-election result to be declared void: 1892 Cirencester by-election
First by-election subject to the Corrupt and Illegal Practices Prevention Act 1883: 1883 Limerick City by-election
First by-election to be held using the secret ballot: 1872 Pontefract by-election

See also
List of United Kingdom by-elections
United Kingdom European Parliament election records
Swing (United Kingdom)
Records of members of parliament of the United Kingdom
United Kingdom general election records

References

Further reading
 Who's Who of British MPs: Volume IV, 1945-1979 by Michael Stenton and Stephen Lees (Harvester, Brighton, 1979) 
 British Political Facts 1900-1994 by David Butler and Gareth Butler (St. Martin's Press, New York, 1994) 
 Election Statistics 1918-2007. House of Commons Library Research Paper 08/12

Lists of by-elections to the Parliament of the United Kingdom
By-election
By-election